Oral Tradition is a peer-reviewed academic journal established in 1986 by John Miles Foley covering studies in oral tradition and related fields. As well as essays treating certifiably oral traditions, the journal presents investigations of the relationships between oral and written traditions, accounts of important fieldwork, and transcriptions and translations of oral texts. Oral Tradition periodically publishes special issues devoted to specific conceptual topics and regional traditions, and it often includes audiovisual materials in the form of companions linked to individual articles. The publication spans a number of academic fields and disciplines, including,  folklore, cultural anthropology, social anthropology, ethnography, ethnomusicology, linguistics, classics, and comparative literature.

Publication history
From 1986 till the end of 2006, Oral Tradition was published by Slavica Publishers, with an additional online edition through Project MUSE from 2003 onward. However, both of these publication venues are subscription-based, and for that reason they unavoidably excluded a substantial segment of the journal's potential readership, particularly non-western academics and institutions. To rectify this, since 2006, Oral Tradition has been published open access and exclusively online by the Center for Studies in Oral Tradition (from 2006 to 2019) and by Harvard University's Center for Hellenic Studies (beginning in 2019).

See also
 Intangible cultural heritage
 Traditional knowledge
 Oral history
 Storytelling

External links
 
 Oral Tradition at Project MUSE
 Center for Studies in Oral Tradition
 Print: 
 Online: 

Oral tradition
Publications established in 1986
Multidisciplinary humanities journals
Biannual journals
Folklore journals
English-language journals
University of Missouri